Ill Blood is the second studio album by Canadian hardcore band No Warning. It was released on November 26, 2002, on Bridge 9 Records.

It is the band's last album on the indie hardcore label Bridge 9. This album was produced by Ben Cook and Dean Baltulonis.

Critical reception
AllMusic wrote that "No Warning's sound is far from melodic -- singer Ben Cook is a vitriolic, atonal screamer in the grand tradition -- but it's more complex and nuanced than that of many of the group's contemporaries."

Track listing
 "Behind These Walls" - 2:36
 "No Time For You" - 2:48
 "Answer The Call" - 1:20
 "Short Fuse" (ft. Mark Porter) - 3:08
 "Wound Up" - 1:36
 "Growing Silent - 2:01
 "Caught In The Web" - 2:28
 "All New Low" - 2:25
 "Over My Shoulder" - 0:56
 "Leech" - 2:12
 "Pushing On" - 1:47
 "Ill Blood" - 3:04

Personnel
Ben Cook - vocals
Matt Delong - guitar
Jordan Posner - guitar
Ryan Gavel - bass
Dj Jacobs - drums

Additional personnel
Mark Porter - vocals
Matt Henderson - guitar
Dean Baltalonis - guitar

References

Bridge 9 Records albums
2002 albums
No Warning (band) albums